Ella Patrice Totengco Fajardo (born March 15, 2003) is a Filipino basketball player who plays point guard for the Fairleigh Dickinson Knights women's basketball team and has represented the Philippine national team in international competitions.

Career

Early years
Fajardo learned the fundamentals of playing basketball by attending a Milo-Best Center in the Philippines. In the United States she attended Gill St. Bernard's School, playing for her high school's basketball team. In her senior year, Fajardo helped her school win the championship securing her a scholarship at Fairleigh Dickinson University.

College
Fajardo announced in July 2021 her commitment to play for NCAA Division I sides Fairleigh Dickinson Knights. The National University in the Philippines also tried to recruit her.

National team
Fajardo, a native of Bergenfield, New Jersey, is eligible to play for the Philippines through both of her parents. She holds dual citizenship.

Fajardo has played for the Philippine women's 3x3 team which won a bronze medal in the 2019 FIBA 3x3 U18 Asia Cup in Malaysia and reached the quarterfinals of the 2019 FIBA 3x3 U18 World Cup in Mongolia.

She debuted for the Philippine women's team at the 2021 FIBA Women's Asia Cup in India.

References

2003 births
Living people
American sportspeople of Filipino descent
Basketball players from New Jersey
Filipino women's basketball players
Gill St. Bernard's School alumni
People from Bergenfield, New Jersey
Philippines women's national basketball team players
Point guards
Sportspeople from Bergen County, New Jersey
Citizens of the Philippines through descent
American women's basketball players
Competitors at the 2021 Southeast Asian Games
Southeast Asian Games gold medalists for the Philippines
Southeast Asian Games competitors for the Philippines
Southeast Asian Games medalists in basketball